These lists contain an overview of the government recognized cultural properties in the Philippines. The lists are based on the official lists provided by the National Commission for Culture and the Arts, National Historical Commission of the Philippines, and the National Museum of the Philippines.

The lists have been subdivided per region.

Cultural sites by region

List of Cultural Properties of the Philippines in Metro Manila
List of Cultural Properties of the Philippines in the Cordillera Administrative Region
List of Cultural Properties of the Philippines in the Ilocos Region
List of Cultural Properties of the Philippines in Cagayan Valley
List of Cultural Properties of the Philippines in Central Luzon
List of Cultural Properties of the Philippines in Calabarzon
List of Cultural Properties of the Philippines in Mimaropa
List of Cultural Properties of the Philippines in the Bicol Region
List of Cultural Properties of the Philippines in Western Visayas
List of Cultural Properties of the Philippines in Central Visayas
List of Cultural Properties of the Philippines in Eastern Visayas
List of Cultural Properties of the Philippines in Zamboanga Peninsula
List of Cultural Properties of the Philippines in Northern Mindanao
List of Cultural Properties of the Philippines in the Davao Region
List of Cultural Properties of the Philippines in Caraga
List of Cultural Properties of the Philippines in Bangsamoro

There are no designated cultural properties in Soccsksargen.

Cultural sites by inscription

List of World Heritage Sites in the Philippines
List of National Cultural Treasures in the Philippines
List of Important Cultural Properties in the Philippines
List of Significant Cultural Properties in the Philippines
List of National Historical Landmarks in the Philippines
List of Heritage Zones in the Philippines
List of National Historical Sites in the Philippines
List of National Shrines in the Philippines
List of National Monuments in the Philippines
List of National Heritage Houses in the Philippines
List of Site Museum Reservations in the Philippines
List of Archaeological Reservations in the Philippines

See also
List of National Cultural Treasures in the Philippines
Intangible Cultural Heritage of the Philippines
List of historical markers of the Philippines

External links

Historic sites in the Philippines
Declared Cultural Properties in the Philippines
Marked Historical Structures of the Philippines
Heritage registers in the Philippines
Lists of buildings and structures in the Philippines
Philippines history-related lists